Phosphatherium escuillei is a basal proboscidean that lived from the Late Paleocene to the early stages of the Ypresian age until the early Thanetian some 56 million years ago in North Africa. Research has suggested that Phosphatherium existed during the Eocene period.

Description

P. escuillei possessed rather flat features, centered around a low skull and a long, straight dorsal profile. The skull itself was rather disproportionate, consisting of an elongated cranial region and a rather short rostrum. The sagittal crest, the ridge along the dorsomedian line of its skull, spans across nearly half of the skull itself. The nasal cavity is high and wide, suggesting a large snout in life.

One of the main factors of Phosphatherium body is its nontraditional musculoskeletal system. The shape of its head is composed of attributes of a snout, more vividly, turning into
a mouth with a rounded jawline. Similar mammals in its order retained a more snout-like nose, which was also a factor that pertained to it having a semiaquatic lifestyle. Furthermore, sexual dimorphism can be noticed on Phosphatherium face by a varying degrees of muscle attachments on its upper jaw.<ref name="gheerbrant2005"/

Phosphatherium lacked a trunk. The tooth rows extend back to roughly 45% of its total skull length. The dental structures suggests that P. escuillei is a heterodont, meaning it possessed more than one type of tooth morphology. This is evident because they possessed more than one type of molar upon fossil examinations. The various dental formations of heterodonts suggest that this animal, unlike later proboscideans, may have been omnivorous.

The unique traits of Phosphatherium teeth suggest them to be intraspecific. Some features of P. escuilliei's teeth and jaw structures also show noticeable variation, which is related to sexual dimorphism. This suggests physiological differences existed between males and females, which ultimately suggest behavioral differences.<ref name="gheerbrantetal2005"/

The lower jaw reached a length of 10 cm and had a rather low body. The number of teeth was somewhat reduced compared to older proboscideans. Adult animals had the following dental formula:  The tooth row extended over a length of 8 cm, taking up less than half of the skull length. In the upper jaw, the second incisor (I2) was enlarged and conical in shape, but was perpendicular to the bone. In the lower jaw, on the other hand, the first incisor (I1) showed clear enlargements. However, both teeth did not yet form true tusks. The anterior dentition did not show a closed row of teeth, in the upper jaw there was an additional small diastema behind the first premolar. The premolars as a whole were quite simply built and not very molarised, i.e. they hardly resembled the molar. These had a bilophodont structure with two clearly formed transverse enamel ridges. The rearmost molar of the mandible, however, had a third enamel bar. In general, the teeth were brachyodont.

Discovery

The first finds were probably made by a fossil dealer in the early 1990s from an unknown location. The two fragments of the upper jaw were coated with phosphate, and the preparation of the finds revealed the tooth of a fossil shark, which dates to the late Paleocene (Thanetian) and thus confirms the ancient age of the finds. The holotype (copy number MNHN PM2) consists of a right upper part of the jaw with the last two premolars and the first two molars (P3 to M2). It is now in the Muséum National d'Histoire Naturelle in Paris. The first scientific description took place in 1996 by Emmanuel Gheerbrant and colleagues. The name Phosphatherium is made up of the Greek words φωςφορος (phosphoros "light-bearing") and θηρίον ( thērion "animal") and refers to the fact that it is stored in phosphate-containing sediments. The only known species is Phosphatherium escuilliei. The species name escuilliei honors the person who found the type fossils, François Escuillié. The first description was largely limited to the tooth features, a more extensive template of the then known find material was only published two years later.

The first fossil finds were discovered in the north-eastern part of the Ouled Abdoun Basin in a phosphate-containing layer. However, they only comprised two fragmented upper jaws. However, the exact location of this find was not known. Further and much more extensive finds were discovered in the early 2000s in the same basin in the Grand Daoui area. This consists of numerous skull fragments, mandibles and some limb elements.<ref name="gheerbrant1998"/ Other very early proboscideans are known from the same area, the related Eritherium and Daouitherium.

Taxonomy
Phosphatherium is known primarily from two maxilla fragments dated to the latest Paleocene deposits of the Ouled Abdoun Basin, Morocco, which date from the Thanetian epoch. Like its later relative, Moeritherium, the animal was probably an amphibious browser that fed on aquatic plants, akin to a very small tapir. Both animals are included in the family Numidotheriidae, together with Numidotherium.

Below is a phylogenetic tree based on Tabuce et al. 2019.<ref name="tabuceetal2019"/

Palaeobiology
 
Phosphatherium is thought to have had a broad diet. The dental microwear patterns observed on their teeth show lengthy scratches on the molars of juveniles. Correspondingly, similar patterns are found on adult individuals. Through study of the wear and specifically scratches on the teeth of Phosphatherium, the food items it ingested include shrubs and bushes, indicating a mixed feeding preference. Adult molars are found to have a much higher density of scratches, indicating abrasive food sources and possibly insects and small animals. Overall, Phosphatherium is thought to be an omnivorous browser mainly determined by its preferences, as well as the availability of resources.

Considering its highly adapted folivorous jaw and tooth structure, Phosphatherium provides evidence of the high age of African endemism. The dental structure of Phosphatherium suggests its diet consisted mainly of leaves, which indicates it may have fulfilled a niche role in its environment, although diet can only be inferred. The discovery of this animal has ultimately helped reinforce the African origin of proboscideans, and provide insight into the radiation of modern orders of placental mammals.

References

 
http://mygeologypage.ucdavis.edu/cowen/historyoflife/Phosphatherium.html

Paleocene proboscideans
Eocene proboscideans
Ypresian extinctions
Transitional fossils
Paleocene mammals of Africa
Eocene mammals of Africa
Prehistoric placental genera
Prehistoric monotypic mammal genera
Fossil taxa described in 1996